Rhinotragus apicalis is a species of beetle in the family Cerambycidae. It was described by Félix Édouard Guérin-Méneville in 1844.

References

Rhinotragini
Beetles described in 1844